Heart of Darkness is an 1899 novella by Joseph Conrad.

Heart of Darkness may also refer to:

Film and television

Film
 Hearts of Darkness: A Filmmaker's Apocalypse, a 1991 documentary about the making of the film Apocalypse Now
 Heart of Darkness (1993 film), a television film adaptation of Conrad's novella, directed by Nicolas Roeg
 Heart of Darkness, a 2003 pornographic film starring Randy Spears

Television
 "Heart of Darkness" (Playhouse 90), a 1958 television play adaptation of Conrad's novella
 "Heart of Darkness" (Miami Vice), a 1984 episode
 "Heart of Darkness" (Once Upon a Time), a 2012 episode
 "Heart of Darkness" (The Vampire Diaries), a 2012 episode

Music 
 Heart of Darkness (opera), a 2011 chamber opera adaptation of Conrad's novella, by Tarik O'Regan
 Hearts of Darkness (band), an American hip hop/big band
 Hearts of Darknesses, a solo dance-music project of Frank Musarra

Albums 
 Heart of Darkness (Burnt by the Sun album), 2009
 Heart of Darkness (Grave Digger album) or the title song, 1995
 Heart of Darkness (EP), by No Trend and Lydia Lunch, 1985
 The Heart of Darkness (album), by Hoodlum Priest, 1990
 Heart of Darkness, by Positive Noise, 1981

Songs 
 "Heart of Darkness", by Arch Enemy from Wages of Sin, 2001
 "Heart of Darkness", by Chris de Burgh from Power of Ten, 1992
 "Heart of Darkness", by the Headstones from Picture of Health, 1993
 "Heart of Darkness", by Heart, B-side of the single "What About Love", 1985
 "Heart of Darkness", by Pere Ubu, B-side of the single "30 Seconds Over Tokyo", 1975
 "Heart of Darkness", by Sparklehorse from Vivadixiesubmarinetransmissionplot, 1995
 "Hearts of Darkness", by Cavalera Conspiracy from Inflikted, 2008

Video games 
 Heart of Darkness (video game), a 1998 cinematic platformer
 Heart of Darkness, a 2013 expansion pack for Victoria II

Other uses 
 Heart of Darkness (brewery), a Vietnamese craft brewery
 Heart of Darkness (comic), a 2003 Star Wars Tales story
 Heart of Darkness (horse) (1988–2011), a British Thoroughbred racehorse

See also 
 "And the Heart of Darkness" (The Librarians), a 2015 television episode
 From the Heart of Darkness, a 1983 short-story collection by David Drake
 In the Heart of Darkness, a 1998 Belisarius series novel by David Drake